André Cristol (13 September 1942 – 5 April 2020) was a French footballer and coach. He played midfielder. He mainly played for AS Béziers Hérault, Montpellier HSC, and Limoges FC. He played 37 matches in Ligue 1 and 168 matches in Ligue 2.

References

1942 births
2020 deaths
Stade Français (association football) players
Association football midfielders
AS Béziers Hérault players
OGC Nice players
Limoges FC players
Montpellier HSC players
French footballers
French football managers
Montpellier HSC managers